Feng Dao (882-May 21, 954), courtesy name Kedao, formally Prince Wenyi of Ying, was a Chinese inventor, printer, and politician. He was an important Chinese governmental official during the Five Dynasties and Ten Kingdoms period, who served as a chancellor during the three of the latter four dynasties (Later Tang, Later Jin, and Later Zhou) and was also an honored official during Later Han.  For his contribution to improving block-printing process for printing Chinese written works, scholars have compared him to the German inventor and blacksmith Johannes Gutenberg.  Traditional histories praised him for his various virtues but also vilified him for not being faithful to a single dynasty but being willing to serve a number of successive dynasties (see Ouyang Xiu and Sima Guang below). Feng Dao is depicted in the Wu Shuang Pu (無雙譜, Table of Peerless Heroes) by Jin Guliang.

Background and service during Yan 
Feng Dao was born in 882, during the reign of Emperor Xizong of Tang.  His family was from Jingcheng (景城, in modern Cangzhou, Hebei).  His ancestors had been alternatively farmers and scholars.  Feng Dao himself was said to be virtuous and tolerant in his youth, studious and capable in writing.  He did not look down on poor clothes or food, and was willing to endure hard labor to support his parents and live in poverty.  At some point, he was invited by Liu Shouguang, one of the major late-Tang warlords, to serve as a secretary at the prefectural government of Liu's capital You Prefecture (幽州, in modern Beijing).

In 911, by which point Tang had fallen and Liu, having initially been a nominal vassal to the succeeding Later Liang, had declared his own state of Yan as its emperor, Feng was serving as a military advisor to Liu.  That year, Liu gathered his troops and prepared to attack Yiwu Circuit (義武, headquartered in modern Baoding, Hebei), which was ruled by its military governor (jiedushi) Wang Chuzhi and allied with Later Liang's archenemy Jin.  Feng tried to urge Liu not to attack Yiwu, arguing that the time was inopportune.  This angered Liu, who threw him in prison, but he was spared his life after others interceded on his behalf.  He thereafter fled to Jin, where Zhang Chengye, the chief eunuch military advisor to Jin's prince Li Cunxu, recommended him to be the secretary general of Jin's capital Taiyuan.

During Jin/Later Tang 
At that time, Li Cunxu was engaged in repeated campaigns to capture territories north of the Yellow River from Later Liang, and the military matters required frequent drafting of orders, which Li entrusted to Feng Dao.

In or around 919, there was an incident where Li had a dispute with his chief military advisor Guo Chongtao, after Guo had opined that Li was inviting too many officers to his meals and that the number should be reduced.  In anger, Li responded, "Is it that we do not get to even decide how many of the people who are willing to die for us would be at our meals?  Maybe the army should choose a new commander, and we will return to Taiyuan."  He asked Feng to draft a declaration to that effect.  Feng took his pen but hesitated to write, and he responded to Li, "Your Royal Highness is now planning to conquer the lands south of the Yellow River and then under heavens.  Guo Chongtao's request is not overly inappropriate.  Even if Your Royal Highness disagreed with him, why make this dispute shock all those near and far, such that our enemies would learn this and believe that you and your subjects are discordant?  This cannot be good for your reputation."  Soon thereafter, Guo came to apologize, and the matter came to rest.  It was said that others became impressed with Feng's temerity in advising the prince.  It was also said that Feng lived frugally during these campaigns, living in straw huts with no beds, and sharing his salaries with his staff members.  Oftentimes, officers pillaged the region and took beautiful women; sometimes they would give the women to Feng as gifts.  Feng would not take the women, but would instead find their families and return them to their families.

In 923, Li declared himself the emperor of a new Later Tang (as Emperor Zhuangzong, theorically  as a continuation of emperor Zhaoxuang) dynasty.  He made Feng, along with Lu Zhi, imperial scholars.  After Emperor Zhuangzong conquered Later Liang later in the year and took its territory under his possession, he made Feng Zhongshu Sheren (中書舍人, a mid-level official at the legislative bureau of government (中書省, Zhongshu Sheng)) and deputy minister of census (戶部侍郎, Hubu Shilang).  When Feng's father died shortly afterwards, he left governmental service to observe a period of mourning at Jingcheng.  At that time, Feng had already become well-known, and the Khitan considered raiding Jingcheng to seize him, but with the Later Tang border forces prepared, the Khitan raid did not actually occur.  While he was at Jingcheng, there was a famine in the region.  He distributed his wealth to aid the people around him.  Also, if there were those who were neglectful in or unable to plow their fields, he would plow their fields for them.

After the end of Feng's mourning period for his father — probably in 926, based on subsequent events — Emperor Zhuangzong summoned Feng back to the imperial government (then at Luoyang) to serve as imperial scholar again.  By the time Feng reached the important city Bian Prefecture (汴州, in modern Kaifeng, Henan), however, the Later Tang state was in a state of confusion because of many mutinies that had risen against Emperor Zhuangzong.  One of the major rebellions was led by Emperor Zhuangzong's adoptive brother Li Siyuan.  Due to the uncertainty, Bian's defender Kong Xun urged Feng to remain at Bian Prefecture until the situation becomes clear, but Feng pointed out that he was under imperial orders to report as soon as possible, so he proceeded to Luoyang.  Soon thereafter, Emperor Zhuangzong was killed in a mutiny at Luoyang itself, and Li Siyuan arrived at Luoyang to claim the throne (as Emperor Mingzong).

Emperor Mingzong had long been respectful of Feng's capabilities and virtues.  As Emperor Mingzong was himself illiterate, and his chief advisor An Chonghui, while literate, was not well-learned, An recommended setting up a system where chief scholars would advise the emperor on historical and literary matters.  Emperor Mingzong thereafter established two posts for imperial scholars at Duanming Hall, and commissioned Feng and Zhao Feng to those posts.  In 927, Emperor Mingzong further made both Feng and Cui Xie chancellors, with the designation of Tong Zhongshu Menxia Pingzhangshi, along with the title of Zhongshu Shilang (中書侍郎, deputy head of the legislative bureau).  (Feng's commission was somewhat of a compromise choice by Emperor Mingzong, as the senior chancellor Ren Huan recommended Li Qi, while Kong, then one of Emperor Mingzong's chiefs of staff (Shumishi) (along with An), pushed for Cui.)  While serving as chancellor, Feng often pointed out to Emperor Mingzong the difficulties that farmers faced, and Emperor Mingzong collected the poems that Feng wrote about such difficulties, often having attendants read the poems to him.  Emperor Mingzong created him the Duke of Shiping.

In 930, as An had long borne grudges against Emperor Mingzong's adoptive son Li Congke, who was then the military governor (Jiedushi) of Huguo Circuit (護國, headquartered in modern Yuncheng, Shanxi), An encouraged Li Congke's subordinate Yang Yanwen to mutiny and seize Huguo's capital Hezhong, forcing Li Congke to return to Luoyang.  An then had Feng and Zhao submit petitions asking for Li Congke to be punished, but Emperor Mingzong refused their request, as well as An's subsequent request for such punishment as well.  Later in the year, when Emperor Mingzong and An had more open disputes over the handling of the rebellions by Meng Zhixiang the military governor of Xichuan Circuit (西川, headquartered in modern Chengdu, Sichuan) and Dong Zhang the military governor of Dongchuan Circuit (東川, headquartered in modern Mianyang, Sichuan), An submitted a resignation, which many officials urged him to withdraw.  Feng believed that An's best course of action at that time was to resign, and so urged the other officials not to stop An from resigning, but Zhao disagreed and was able to persuade An to remain chief of staff.  (Feng turned out to be correct, as in 931, after the rift between Emperor Mingzong and An became greater, Emperor Mingzong had An demoted and then killed.)

In 933, Emperor Mingzong became gravely ill.  His oldest son Li Congrong, generally considered his heir presumptive, was fearful that the imperial officials would oppose his succession, and therefore decided to try to seize power by force even before Emperor Mingzong's death.  Li Congrong's mutiny ended in failure, and he was killed.  Some of the key officials urged for mass execution of Li Congrong's staff members, but Feng Dao and Feng Yun urged leniency, and so most of them were only exiled.  Emperor Mingzong died shortly after and was succeeded by his son Li Conghou the Prince of Song (as Emperor Min).  Feng Dao continued to serve Emperor Min as chancellor.

In 934, Emperor Min's then-chief advisors, Feng Yun and Zhu Hongzhao, did not want Li Congke, who was then the military governor of Fengxiang Circuit (鳳翔, headquartered in modern Baoji, Shaanxi), and Emperor Min's brother-in-law Shi Jingtang the military governor of Hedong Circuit (河東, headquartered in modern Taiyuan) to be entrenched in their posts, and therefore issued a series of transfer orders that, inter alia, transferred Li Congke to Hedong and Shi to Chengde Circuit (成德, headquartered in modern Shijiazhuang, Hebei).  Li Congke considered this a trap, and therefore rebelled against Emperor Min.  The imperial army sent to attack him mutinied and joined his rebellion, and he approached Luoyang.  Emperor Min fled.  As Li Congke was ready to enter Luoyang, Feng Dao, in an action that was criticized both at that time and in posterity, requested the official Lu Dao to draft a petition for officials to sign, urging Li Congke to take the throne, which Lu refused to draft and rebuked Feng about.  Still, subsequently, an edict was issued in the name of Emperor Mingzong's wife Empress Dowager Cao, deposing Emperor Min and making Li Congke emperor.  (Emperor Min was subsequently killed in exile.)  Li Congke had Feng Dao serve as the director of Emperor Mingzong's tomb.  Once the tomb was completed, he sent Feng out of the capital, to serve as the military governor of Kuangguo Circuit (匡國, headquartered in modern Weinan, Shaanxi), still carrying the Tong Zhongshu Menxia Pingzhangshi  (chancellor) title as an honorary title.  While at Kuangguo's capital Tong Prefecture, Feng's governance was said to be lenient.  In 935, Li Congke recalled him from Kuangguo to serve as Sikong — a highly honored post as one of the Three Excellencies — but one that lacked real authority.  Indeed, as there had long not been anyone who served merely as one of the Three Excellencies without a substantive post (Feng himself had served as Sikong as well when he was chancellor earlier, as an additional title), no one in the imperial government knew what the Sikong was supposed to do.  The chancellor Lu Wenji thought that the Sikong was supposed to be in charge of cleaning the altar at imperial sacrifices — a ceremonial duty that Feng stated that he would be honored to carry out — but soon Lu figured out that it was inappropriate to ask the highly honored Feng to actually carry out cleanings, and so did not mention that again.

During Later Jin 
In 936, Shi Jingtang, who feared that Li Congke was actually planning to kill him when Li Congke ordered him transferred to Tianping Circuit (天平, headquartered in modern Tai'an, Shandong), rebelled against Li Congke, and with aid from Khitan's Emperor Taizong, soon declared himself emperor of a new state of Later Jin (as its Emperor Gaozu), defeated Later Tang troops that Li Congke sent against him, and approached Luoyang.  Li Congke committed suicide, along with his wife Empress Liu, his children, and Empress Dowager Cao.  The new Later Jin emperor entered Luoyang.  Later in the year, he gave Feng Dao, in addition to nonsubstantive Sikong title, the titles Tong Zhongzhu Menxia Pingzhangshi and Menxia Shilang (門下侍郎, deputy head of the examination bureau (門下省, Menxia Sheng)), thus making him chancellor again.

In 938, Emperor Gaozu honored the Khitan emperor to be "father emperor" while referring to himself as "son emperor," and also offered honored titles to Emperor Taizong's mother Empress Dowager Shulü Ping.  As a sign of further respect, he sent Feng and another senior official, Liu Xu to Khitan to offer those honors, as well as gifts, to the emperor and empress dowager.  (This mission was despite Emperor Gaozu's reservation that Emperor Taizong, impressed by Feng, might detain him.  Feng pointed out that given Khitan's aid to Emperor Gaozu, he was willing to take the risk on the emperor's behalf.  Emperor Taizong did consider doing so but eventually allowed Feng to return to Later Jin.)

In 939, Emperor Gaozu abolished the office of Shumishi, believing that it had grown overly powerful, and gave its powers to chancellors, particularly Feng.  He was soon given the titles of Situ (司徒, also one of the Three Excellencies) and Shizhong (侍中, head of the examination bureau), and created the Duke of Lu.  It was said that at one point, Feng offered to resign on account of illness, and Emperor Gaozu sent his nephew Shi Chonggui the Prince of Zheng — the most honored male member of the imperial family at that point as Emperor Gaozu's sons, except for the young Shi Chongrui, had all been killed either in his own rebellion against Later Tang or been killed in rebellions against him — to dissuade Feng from resigning, and further relayed, through Shi Chongrui, the comment, "If you do not return, I will personally come visit you."  It was only after this that Feng returned to the government to continue to serve as chancellor, and it was said that no one was more honored in the administration.  It was said that, around this time, Feng and another chancellor, Li Song, recommended Emperor Gaozu's brother-in-law Du Chongwei, who was then the deputy commander of the imperial guards, to take over as the commander, displacing the general Liu Zhiyuan, and thus drew resentment from Liu.

Because Shi Chongrui was young, Emperor Gaozu never designated him as heir.  However, in 942, when Emperor Gaozu grew ill, he summoned Feng, had Shi Chongrui come out to bow to Feng, and put Shi Chongrui in Feng's lap, hinting strongly that he wanted Feng to support Shi Chongrui to succeed him.  However, after Emperor Gaozu soon died, Feng discussed the matter with the imperial guard general Jing Yanguang.  Feng and Jing both opined that given the perilous state that Later Jin was in at that time, an older emperor was needed.  They thus supported Shi Chonggui, who then carried the title of Prince of Qi, to be emperor.  Shi Chonggui gave Feng the honorary title of Taiwei (太尉, also one of the Three Excellencies) and created him the Duke of Yan.

Shi Chonggui, contrary to the humble posture that Emperor Gaozu took with Khitan, took a more hostile posture toward Khitan.  In particular, whereas Emperor Gaozu referred to himself as "son" and "your subject" when writing Emperor Taizong, Shi Chonggui took the position advocated by Jing, that he should only refer to himself as "grandson" and not "your subject" — in other words, leaving the personal relationship intact but at the same time disavowing that Later Jin was a vassal to Khitan.  Li Song tried to argue against this stance, but with Feng not opposing or supporting it, Shi Chonggui's letter to Emperor Taizong notifying that Emperor Gaozu had died and that he had succeeded Emperor Gaozu referred to himself only as grandson.  This displeased Emperor Taizong, who wrote back, rebuking Shi Chonggui for taking the throne without Khitan approval.  Emperor Taizong took no hostile military action at that time, but by 944, with his general Zhao Yanshou encouraging a campaign and with Emperor Taizong promising Zhao that he would be made the emperor of the Central Plains if he succeeded, there began to be repeated Khitan incursions into Later Jin territory.  With Feng considered an indecisive chancellor not willing to make decisions, Shi Chonggui sent him back to Kuangguo to serve as its military governor, carrying the Shizhong title as an honorary chancellor title.  After about a year there, he was transferred to Weisheng Circuit (威勝, headquartered in modern Nanyang, Henan), carrying the title of Zhongshu Ling (中書令, head of the legislative bureau) as an honorary chancellor title.

During Liao incursion 
In 946, after defeating and then persuading Du Wei (i.e., Du Chongwei, who had removed the "Chong" character from his name to observe naming taboo), whom Shi Chonggui had commissioned as the commander of a major anti-Khitan army, to surrender, Khitan's Emperor Taizong advanced all the way south to the Later Jin capital Kaifeng, forcing Shi Chonggui to surrender.  In 947, Emperor Taizong took the clothes of a Chinese emperor and declared himself Emperor of Liao (i.e., not using the Khitan name any more), effectively showing his intent to be the emperor of China proper as well, and summoned the Later Jin military governors to Kaifeng to meet him.  Feng Dao, who was then still at Weisheng, did so.  As both Zhao Yanshou and Zhang Li had recommended Li Song, Emperor Taizong treated both Feng and Li with respect.  He made Li Shumishi, while giving Feng Dao the capital of acting Taifu and had him, while not officially be Shumishi, work out of that office and consult on important matters.  It was said that there was a conversation where Emperor Taizong asked him, "How do I save all people under the heaven?"  Feng responded, "At this time, not even if the Buddha reentered the world can the people be saved, but only the Emperor can save them."  It was believed that these words, along with the intercession of Zhao, was the reason why Emperor Taizong did not carry out mass executions of the Han people.  When the Later Jin general Liu Jixun, whom Emperor Taizong blamed for participating in Shi Chonggui's planning for the anti-Khitan campaign, Liu tried to blame Feng and Jing Yangguang for being behind the campaign; Emperor Taizong rebuked Liu for blaming Feng, and had him delivered to the northern Khitan city of Huanglong (黃龍, in modern Changchun, Jilin).

By spring 947, however, Emperor Taizong was faced with numerous Han mutinies due to his harsh raids against the population.  He decided to leave his brother-in-law Xiao Han in charge of Kaifeng while he himself took the Later Jin wealth and its key officials north, back to Liao proper.  He died on the way, and the Liao generals supported his nephew Yelü Ruan as his successor (as Emperor Shizong).  Emperor Shizong, after arresting Zhao (who had wanted to take the throne himself) thereafter declared himself emperor.  Meanwhile, Liu Zhiyuan, in this power vacuum, declared himself emperor of a new Later Han (as its Emperor Gaozu) and advanced south, quickly entering Kaifeng after Xiao withdrew from it, and took over most of Later Jin territory.

Meanwhile, Empress Dowager Shulü opposed Emperor Shizong's ascension and sent an army against him.  He defeated her army, and subsequently put her under house arrest.  During the campaign, however, he left the general Yelü Mada in charge of Heng Prefecture (恆州, in modern Shijiazhuang), where Feng, along with other former Later Jin chancellors Li Song and He Ning, had remained.  Yelü Mada was corrupt and harsh, and also put the Han soldiers under severe restrictions, drawing their discontent.  When Emperor Shizong subsequently sent an order for the Later Jin officials to continue to advance north to attend to Emperor Taizong's funeral, the Han soldiers mutinied under the leadership of the officer Bai Zairong.  During the battle inside Heng Prefecture, at the urging of Li Gu, Feng, Li Song, and He Ning personally went to encourage the soldiers to fight, and it was said that that raised the morale of the Han soldiers, who subsequently defeated Yelü Mada and forced him to flee with his remaining Khitan soldiers.  The soldiers subsequently offered the military governorship of the region (Chengde Circuit to Feng, but Feng declined, pointing out that a military officer should do so, so Bai claimed the title of acting military governor, and subsequently submitted to Later Han.

During Later Han 
Feng Dao, Li Song, and He Ning subsequently went to then-Later Han capital Kaifeng.  Emperor Gaozu immediately commissioned Li Song and He Ning with honorary titles (albeit not substantive ones), but did not commission Feng until spring 948 (when he gave Feng the even more honored title of Taishi, but no substantive offices).

At the time of Emperor Gaozu's death in spring 948 (shortly after Feng was commissioned Taishi), Emperor Gaozu had left directions to the officials and generals he entrusted his son Liu Chengyou (Emperor Yin) to (Su Fengji, Yang Bin, Shi Hongzhao, and Guo Wei) to watch Du Chongwei (who had restored his original name after Later Jin's fall) closely, and shortly after Emperor Gaozu's death, the four, announcing the order as an order from Emperor Gaozu, had Du put to death.  This caused great apprehension to Li Shouzhen, who had also become a Later Han subject.  Later in spring 948, Li therefore rebelled at his post as military governor of Huguo and claimed the title of Prince of Qin, in alliance with Wang Jingchong the military governor of Fengxiang and Zhao Siwan, a rebel officer who had seized control of Jinchang Circuit (晉昌, headquartered in modern Xi'an, Shaanxi).  The leading officials decided to have Guo lead the imperial guard troops against Li.  Before Guo departed, he went to see Feng to request Feng's opinion; Feng opined to him that since Li had long led the imperial guards that Guo would be commanding, he needed to destroy their affinity to Li by rewarding them greatly regardless of impact on the imperial treasury.  Guo agreed, and it was said that this move made Guo popular among the imperial guards such that Li had no ability to sway them.  Guo was thereafter able to defeat Li in 949, and Li committed suicide; Wang subsequently also did so, and Zhao, after initially surrendering to Later Han forces sent against him, reconsidered, and was then killed by Later Han troops, ending the three rebellions.

In 950, Feng wrote an autobiographical note titled the Self-Description of the Old Man from Changle that discussed family history and his career, including the honors that had been bestowed on him and his family members by the succeeding dynasties.  (This text drew severe criticism from the later Song Dynasty historians Ouyang Xiu (the lead editor of the New History of the Five Dynasties) and Sima Guang (the lead editor of the Zizhi Tongjian), both of whom described Feng as disloyal and the most wicked among officials as a result.)

In winter 950, Emperor Yin, angry that Yang, Shi, and Guo, along with the chancellor Wang Zhang, had held onto power and not let him make decisions alone, had Yang, Shi, and Wang killed.  Guo, who was commanding an army to the north and not at the capital Kaifeng at that time, escaped the fate, but Emperor Yin still had his family and that of Guo's army monitor Wang Jun killed.  Guo thereafter rebelled and took the army toward Kaifeng, defeating the imperial army that Emperor Yin personally commanded to face him.  Emperor Yin fled and was killed in flight.  When Guo subsequently entered the capital, Feng did not bow to him, but accepted his bows, stating to him calmly, "This trip you, Shizhong, undertook, was not an easy one."  This apparently set back Guo's plan to take the throne himself, and Guo subsequently led the officials to greet Emperor Gaozu's wife Empress Dowager Li, who decreed that Emperor Gaozu's nephew Liu Yun, whom Emperor Gaozu had adopted as a son and who was then the military governor of Wuning Circuit (武寧, headquartered in modern Xuzhou, Jiangsu), be made emperor.  She then sent Feng, along with the officials Wang Du and Zhao Shangjiao, to Wuning's capital Xu Prefecture to escort Liu Yun back to the capital to take the throne.

However, the officers under Guo were largely against supporting another member of the Liu family as emperor, as they were fearful of being punished for having sacked the capital.  They subsequently mutinied at Chan Prefecture (澶州, in modern Puyang, Henan) and supported Guo as emperor.  Guo accepted, and headed back into Kaifeng, softening Empress Dowager Li's resistance by promising to honor her like a mother, while sending his officer Guo Chongwei to intercept Liu Yun's train.  When Guo Chongwei arrived, he took over Liu Yun's escorting forces and delivered Guo Wei's orders, summoning Feng back to the capital, leaving Liu Yun with Zhao and Wang, and effectively putting Liu Yun under house arrest.  (Liu Yun was later killed.)  In spring 951, Guo Wei took the throne as Emperor Taizu of a new Later Zhou.

During Later Zhou 
Shortly after the new Later Zhou emperor took the throne, he made Feng Dao Zhongshu Ling, thus restoring him to chancellorship.

Later in the year, the general Murong Yanchao, a half brother of Later Han's Emperor Gaozu, who initially submitted to Later Zhou, rebelled at Taining Circuit (泰寧, headquartered in modern Jining, Shandong).  After Murong was defeated and committed suicide in early 952, Emperor Taizu considered slaughtering Murong's soldiers.  However, the imperial scholar Dou Yi met with Feng and fellow chancellor Fan Zhi and persuaded them to argue to Emperor Taizu (along with Dou himself) that the Taining soldiers were merely forced into combat by Murong.  They were able to persuade Emperor Taizu, who thereafter pardoned the Taining soldiers.

Later that year, another imperial scholar, Xu Taifu, had requested that Ge Yanyu and Li Cheng, who had falsely accused Li Song of plotting to join Li Shouzhen's rebellion in 948 and whose false accusations led to the slaughter of Li Song and his family, be put to death.  Feng opined that there had been a chance in dynasties and many general pardons in the interim, so the charges should not be pursued.  However, fellow chancellor Wang Jun was impressed by Xu's fervor to avenge Li Song, and recommended Ge's and Li Cheng's death.  Emperor Taizu thereafter put Ge and Li Cheng to death.

In 953, believing that Wang was growing too powerful and too insolent in his behavior (including trying to prevent Emperor Taizu's adoptive son Guo Rong from coming to the capital Kaifeng to pay homage to the emperor, in fear of Guo Rong's diverting powers from him), Emperor Taizu, after consulting with Feng and the other chancellors, forced Wang into medical retirement.  (After Wang's retirement and subsequent death, Guo Rong was able to stay at the capital and thereafter would remain in the power center.)

Emperor Taizu died in 954 and was succeeded by Guo Rong (as Emperor Shizong).  Shortly after Emperor Shizong's enthronement, even before Emperor Taizu's burial, Li Yun's biological father Liu Min (né Liu Chong), who had declared himself emperor and legitimate successor of the Later Han throne at Taiyuan, shortly after Emperor Taizu's proclamation of Later Zhou (and whose state, while claiming to be a continuation of Later Han, became known historically as Northern Han), decided to launch a major attack on Later Zhou with Liao support, hoping to reestablish Han control over the central plains.  Emperor Shizong decided to react by personally leading an army against Liu Min.  Feng and many other officials had reservations about having the new emperor personally lead the army (arguing that Emperor Shizong's absence may lead to other rebellions), which led to a heated exchange recorded by historians between Emperor Shizong and Feng:

The tone of the exchange displeased Emperor Shizong, but the chancellor Wang Pu agreed with Emperor Shizong's idea of personally leading an army, and so Emperor Shizong did so anyway.  As Emperor Shizong was ready to depart, he commissioned Feng to be in charge of accompanying Emperor Taizu's casket to the imperial tomb and overseeing its burial.  Emperor Shizong ended up crushing the Northern Han army on the campaign, while Feng died before Emperor Shizong's victorious return.

Contribution to the development of printing 
In 932, Feng Dao ordered the Confucian classics printed using movable wood blocks.  About a century after the invention of block-printing, Feng Dao significantly improved the printing process, and utilized it as a political tool.  (The project was completed in 953, when the completed printing blocks were presented to Emperor Taizu of Later Zhou.)  He is generally regarded as the inventor of modern printing in China, as Johannes Gutenberg is in the West.  The first standard edition of the Confucian classics with commentary was published in 130 volumes between 932 and 953 in Xi'an.  The improved printing technology quickly spread, and the earliest known Korean book was printed in 950.

"The work of Feng Tao and his associates for printing in China may be compared to the work of Gutenberg in Europe. There had been printing before Gutenberg − block printing certainly and very likely experimentation in typography also − but Gutenberg's Bible heralded a new day in the civilization of Europe. In the same way there had been printing before Feng Tao, but it was an obscure art that had little effect on the culture of the country. Feng Tao's Classics made printing a power that ushered in the renaissance of the Sung era."  (The version of the text that Feng used came from the text that the Tang chancellor Zheng Tan had ordered carved on stone at then-Tang capital Chang'an.)

Notes

References

 History of the Five Dynasties, vol. 126.
 New History of the Five Dynasties, vol. 54.
 Zizhi Tongjian, vols. 268, 270, 272, 275, 276, 277, 278, 279, 280, 281, 282, 283, 284, 285, 286, 287, 288, 289, 290, 291.

881 births
954 deaths
Chinese inventors
Chinese princes
Chinese printers
Generals from Hebei
Jin (Later Tang precursor) people born during Tang
Jin (Later Tang precursor) politicians
Later Jin (Five Dynasties) chancellors
Later Jin (Five Dynasties) jiedushi of Kuangguo Circuit
Later Jin (Five Dynasties) jiedushi of Weisheng Circuit
Later Han (Five Dynasties) politicians
Later Tang chancellors
Later Tang jiedushi of Kuangguo Circuit
Later Zhou chancellors
Liao dynasty chancellors
Politicians from Cangzhou
Yan (Five Dynasties period) people born during Tang
Legendary Chinese people